Yıldızoğlu is a Turkish surname. Notable people with the surname include:

 Aylin Yıldızoğlu (born 1975), Turkish female basketball player
 Ceyhun Yıldızoğlu (born 1967), Turkish professional basketball coach

Turkish-language surnames